Myron Russcol Sharaf (July 7, 1926 – May 13, 1997) was an American writer and psychotherapist. He was a lecturer in psychiatry at Harvard Medical School, the director of the Center for Sociopsychological Research and Education at Boston State Hospital, and assistant clinical professor of psychology in the Department of Psychiatry at Tufts University School of Medicine.

Sharaf was a student, patient, and colleague of Wilhelm Reich's from 1948 to 1954, and the author of what is widely regarded as the definitive biography of Reich, Fury On Earth (1983).  He died of a heart attack in Berlin in 1997, after addressing a conference in Vienna marking Reich's centennial.

Early life and education
Sharaf was born in Miami, but grew up in Brookline, Massachusetts, the son of Nathan Sharaf and Anne Russcol Sharaf. His father founded the Steaming Kettle Coffee Shop chain. His paternal great-grandparents,
originally named Sharafsky, were Jewish emigrants from the Russian Empire. He obtained his first degree in psychology from Harvard College in 1949, an M.Ed. from Tufts University in 1953, and a Ph.D. in psychology and education from Harvard University in 1960.

Fury on Earth
A New York Times review of Fury on Earth: A Biography of Wilhelm Reich describes Sharaf as "intimate for more than 10 years as student, disciple, patient and colleague" of Reich. Paul Roazen wrote in The Psychoanalytic Review, "Myron Sharaf's Fury on Earth is far and away the finest book both on Reich's work and his life. It is a work of scholarship that may well, until the Reich Archives are finally opened, remain definitive on the subject."

Bibliography

with Milton Greenblatt. 
with Milton Greenblatt and Evelyn M. Stone.

See also
 Life Against Death

Notes

Further reading
Reich, Robbie. "Ode to a Therapist", extract from Breathe; also published in the Journal of Family Life, Volume 3/4, 1997.

1926 births
1997 deaths
American non-fiction writers
Harvard College alumni
American psychotherapists
Body psychotherapy
Boston State Hospital physicians
Orgonomy
Tufts University School of Arts and Sciences alumni
American medical researchers
20th-century American writers
People from Newton, Massachusetts
20th-century American Jews
American people of Russian-Jewish descent
20th-century American non-fiction writers